Steven Boyd (born 12 April 1997) is a Scottish professional footballer who plays as a forward for Inverness Caledonian Thistle.

Boyd has previously played for Hamilton Academical, Albion Rovers, Livingston, East Fife, Peterhead and Alloa Athletic.

Club career
After being a member of the youth system at Celtic (where he moved through the age groups with Kieran Tierney and won multiple trophies including the Glasgow Cup) Boyd was released and signed for Hamilton Academical in 2014; he made his senior debut for the club in the Scottish Premiership on 23 May 2015, a few weeks after turning 18. The following season, he made only five league appearances but was in the match day squad for the majority of fixtures, and a regular in the SPFL Development League.

On 19 August 2016, Boyd signed for League One club Albion Rovers on loan until January 2017.

He was loaned to Championship club Livingston in December 2017, initially on an "emergency" basis. The loan was extended in January 2018 until the end of the season.

In January 2019 he signed a new contract with Hamilton, running until the end of the 2020–21 season. Boyd left the club in August 2019.

In September 2019 he signed for East Fife on a short-term deal until January 2020.

In January 2020 he moved to Peterhead.

Boyd signed for Alloa Athletic in June 2021.

The striker signed for Inverness Caledonian Thistle in 2022.

International career
Boyd represented Scotland at under-15, under-16 and under-17 youth international level.

Career statistics

References

1997 births
Living people
Scottish footballers
Celtic F.C. players
Hamilton Academical F.C. players
Albion Rovers F.C. players
Livingston F.C. players
East Fife F.C. players
Scottish Professional Football League players
Association football forwards
Scotland youth international footballers
Peterhead F.C. players
Alloa Athletic F.C. players
Inverness Caledonian Thistle F.C. players